The Gangsters is a 1913 American short comedy film featuring Roscoe "Fatty" Arbuckle as one of the Keystone Cops.

Cast
 Roscoe 'Fatty' Arbuckle
 Nick Cogley
 Fred Mace
 Hank Mann
 Ford Sterling
 Al St. John

See also
 Fatty Arbuckle filmography

References

External links

1913 films
Silent American comedy films
1913 comedy films
1913 short films
American silent short films
American black-and-white films
Films directed by Henry Lehrman
American comedy short films
1910s American films